The Kensington Historic District is a national historic district located at Kensington, Montgomery County, Maryland.  The district includes the core of the original town that was incorporated in 1894.  It is dominated by large late-19th and early-20th-century houses, many with wraparound porches, stained-glass windows, and curving brick sidewalks. Large well-kept lawns, ample sized lots, flowering shrubbery, and tree-lined streets contribute to the historic environment which Kensington still retains despite its proximity to Washington, D.C.

It was listed on the National Register of Historic Places in 1980.

See also
Kensington (MARC station)

References

External links
, including photo in 2003, at Maryland Historical Trust website
Boundary Map of the Kensington Historic District, Montgomery County, at Maryland Historical Trust
Kensington Historical Society

Historic districts on the National Register of Historic Places in Maryland
Historic districts in Montgomery County, Maryland
National Register of Historic Places in Montgomery County, Maryland